Kuromondokuga is a genus of tussock moths in the family Erebidae erected by Yasunori Kishida in 2011.

Species
Based on Wang, H. et al.:
Kuromondokuga albofascia (Leech, 1888)
Kuromondokuga niphonis (Butler, 1881)
Kuromondokuga separata (Leech, 1890)

References

Lymantriinae
Moth genera